The 1993–94 St. Louis Blues season was the 27th for the franchise in St. Louis, Missouri, and the final season for the Blues at the St. Louis Arena. The Blues finished the regular-season with a record of 40 wins, 33 losses and 11 ties, good for 91 points, and a trip to the Stanley Cup playoffs, where they were swept by the Dallas Stars in the Western Conference Quarterfinals. For the second consecutive year, the Blues had two 50-goal scorers (Brett Hull and Brendan Shanahan).

Off-season

Regular season

Final standings

Schedule and results

Playoffs
The Blues got swept by the Stars in 4 games

Player statistics

Regular season
Scoring

Goaltending

Playoffs
Scoring

Goaltending

Awards and records

Transactions

Draft picks
St. Louis's draft picks at the 1993 NHL Entry Draft held at the Quebec Coliseum in Quebec City, Quebec.

Farm teams

See also
1993–94 NHL season

References

External links

S
S
St. Louis Blues seasons
St
St